The Yarra Track is the former name of the gold fields road from Healesville to the Woods Point and Jordan Goldfields, in Victoria, Australia.

History 
A direct route via the Yarra River and the Great Divide was discovered by Reick in September 1862 and became known as the Yarra Track. Early in 1863, the Victorian Government decided to construct a  road along the route. This Track involved the climbing of the Black Spur, descent into the Acheron Valley, and then through Marysville to the Cumberland where it followed the existing route. The old route through Paradise Plains subsequently dropped out of vogue. 

In 1865, the first drays and wagons reached Woods Point via the Yarra Track, but they could only get through during the summer months.

Clement Wilks, an engineer with the Victorian Department of Roads and Bridges, was a member of the Yarra Track Committee responsible for building this coach and dray road, designing a number or small bridges and culverts including the Wilks Creek Bridge, on the Marysville Road, and the Big Culvert.

Two main construction camps were established in new localities on the Yarra Track at Healesville and Marysville. These were surveyed as towns to serve as base camps for construction teams and as staging towns when the coach route was completed. Marysville was founded and surveyed in August, 1864. Healesville was surveyed in September 1864, which resulted in the deviation of the settlement at New Chum. Healesville was at the furthest point coaches could travel along the route from Melbourne. From there, a packhorse track climbed through the mountains to the diggings. Shanties were built every five or six miles from New Chum to the diggings. Accommodation houses and stores were strung along the rest of the road. 

The Black Spur section became a popular tourist destination and sought after location for notable early photographers in Victoria, such as Nicholas Caire and J. W. Lindt. In 1916 a bus service was introduced, taking travellers over the route in two twelve-seater Buick charabancs. The journey from Melbourne took four and a half hours.

See also

 Roads in Victoria

References

Bibliography
 Thomas, Ann. The last of the Yarra Track stopping place. Marysville, 1983.
 Thomas, Ann. Wilks Creek Bridge at Marysville, Victoria. 1993.

External links 

History of Victoria (Australia)
Roads in Victoria (Australia)
Yarra Valley